Sabriye is a feminine Turkish given name. Notable people with the name include:

Sabriye Gönülkırmaz (born 1994), Turkish volleyball player
Sabriye Şengül (born 1988), Turkish boxer, kickboxer and mixed martial artist
Sabriye Tenberken (born 1970), German blind social worker of Turkish origin

Turkish feminine given names